This is a list of all types of vehicle that can be used on a railway, either specifically for running on the rails, or for maintenance or up-keep of a railway.

General classes of railway vehicle

 Freight car (US)
 Goods wagon (UIC)
 High speed train
 Locomotive
 Multiple unit
 Diesel Multiple Unit
 Electric Multiple Unit
 Passenger car or coach
 Private railroad car
 Railcar or Railbus
 Rail motor coach
 Road-rail vehicle
 Rolling stock
 Tilting train
 Travelling Post Office

Railway vehicles listed by usage

Traction vehicles or propelled cars

 Autorail
 Cab car or Control car (rail)
 Driving Van Trailer
 Driving Brake Standard Open
 Shunter or Switcher
 Tank locomotive

Passenger use

 Baggage car
 Bilevel car
 Coach (rail)
 Comet (railcar)
 Compartment coach
 Corridor coach
 Couchette car
 Dining car
 Dome car
 Observation car
 Open coach
 Parlor car
 Shoreliner
 Sleeping car
 Slip coach
 Superliner (railcar)

Freight use

Container use

 Boxmotor
 CargoSprinter
 Conflat
 Double-stack car
 Megafret

Bulk freight

 Boxcar (US)
 Centerbeam cars
 Covered hopper
 Covered wagon (UIC)
 Double door boxcar
 Flatcar
 Gondola (rail) (US)
 Goods wagon
 Hicube boxcars
 Hopper car
 Open wagon (UIC)
 Refrigerator car (US)
 Refrigerated van (UIC)
 Tank car (US), Tank wagon (UIC)

Special use

 Aircraft parts car
 Autorack
 Coil car (rail)
 Lowmac
 Mineral wagon
 Quarry tub
 Schnabel car
 Slate wagon
 Stock car (rail)

Multi-modal

 Intermodal car
 Modalohr Road Trailer Carriers
 Roadrailer
 Well car

Ancillary vehicles

 Brake van
 Caboose
 Crane (railroad)
 Handcar
 Roll-block wagon
 Scale test car
 Transporter wagon
 Outfit Car or a Camp Car

Military use
 Railroad plough
 Railway gun
 Troop sleeper

Maintenance of Rail vehicles

 Adzer/Cribber
 Anchor machine
 Ballast cleaner
 Ballast regulator
 Ballast tamper
 Catenary maintenance vehicle
 Clearance car
 Comboliner
 Crew car
 Dynamometer car
 Flanger
 Handcar
 HiRail truck
 OTM reclaimer (scrap loader)
 Railgrinder
 Rail heater
 Rotary snowplow
 Speedswing
 Speeder
 Spike puller
 Spiker
 Spiker gauger
 Tie crane
 Tie extractor/inserter
 Tie Spacer
 Track geometry car
 Track renewal train
 TR10

Railway vehicles listed alphabetically

A

 Aircraft parts car
 Autorack
 Autorail
 Aérotrain

B

 Baggage car
 Ballast cleaner
 Ballast regulator
 Ballast tamper
 Bilevel car
 Boxcab
 Boxcar
 Boxmotor
 Brake van

C

 Cab car
 Caboose
 CargoSprinter
 Centerbeam cars
 Clearance car
 Coach (rail)
 Conflat
 Container car
 Coil car (rail)
 Comboliner
 Comet (passenger car)
 Control car (rail)
 Couchette car
 Covered hopper
 Crane (railroad)
 Crew car

D

 Derrick car
 Diesel Multiple Unit
 Dining car
 Dome car
 Double door boxcar
 Double-stack car
 Draisine
 Driving Van Trailer
 Driving Brake Standard Open
 Dynamometer car

E

 Electric Multiple Unit

F

 Flatcar
 Flanger
 Freight car

G
 General Utility Van
 Gondola (rail)
 Grain car

H

 Handcar
 Hicube boxcar
 High speed train
 HiRail truck
 Hopper car

L

 Locomotive
 Lowmac

M
 Megafret
 Modalohr road trailer carriers
 Multiple unit

O

 Observation car
 Outfit Car or a Camp Car

P

 Pacer (train)
 Passenger car (rail)
 Pendolino
 Private railroad car

R

 Rail ambulance
 Railcar
 Railgrinder
 Rail motor coach
 Railroad plough
 Railway gun
 Refrigerator car
 Revenue collection cars
 Roadrailer
 Road-rail vehicle
 Roll-block wagon
 Rotary snowplow

S

 Scale test car
 Schnabel car
 Shunter
 Slate wagon
 Sleeping car
 Slip coach
 Speeder
 Spiker
 Steam locomotive
 Steam railcar
 Stock car (rail)
 Superliner (railcar)
 Switcher

T

 Tamper
 Tank car
 Tank locomotive
 Tender
 Tower car
 Track geometry car
 Track renewal train
 Transporter wagon
 Travelling Post Office
 Troop sleeper

References 

Railway
Vehicles